Stephen J. Bisciotti (born April 10, 1960) is an American business executive and the current majority owner of the Baltimore Ravens of the NFL. He founded Aerotek, the largest privately owned staffing and recruiting company in the U.S. based in Hanover, Maryland, and cofounded Allegis Group, an international talent management firm headquartered in Hanover, Maryland that owns Aerotek; TEKsystems; Actalent; MarketSource; Major, Lindsey & Africa; Aston Carter; and Allegis Global Solutions.

Background
Bisciotti was born on April 10, 1960 in Philadelphia, Pennsylvania, the youngest of three children in a middle class Italian-American family. In 1961, his parents, Bernard and Patricia Bisciotti, moved the family to Severna Park, Maryland, a suburb of Baltimore, for his father's job as a construction sales executive.

As a child, Bisciotti often went with his family to Baltimore Orioles and Colts games. When he was 8 years old, his father died of leukemia. After his father's death, his maternal grandfather, C. Gordon Johnston, a retired regional district salesman for Ford Motor Co., supported the family.

Bisciotti attended the Severn School but left after two years and transferred to Severna Park High School. In his senior year, he played on the football team, though he has said "I wasn’t much of a high school athlete, but played football, baseball, and basketball all the time when I was growing up".

In 1982, Bisciotti graduated from Salisbury State University in Maryland with a degree in liberal arts. A year later, at 23, he and his cousin Jim Davis started Aerotek, a staffing company in the aerospace and technology sectors. Running the company out of a basement office with secondhand equipment, Bisciotti and Davis produced $1.5 million in sales in the first year. Aerotek grew into the Allegis Group, which is now the largest privately held staffing firm in the world. Bisciotti's involvement in the sports business has brought more attention to his once low-profile company.

Sports ownership
On March 27, 2000, NFL owners approved the sale of 49% of the Ravens to Bisciotti. In the deal, he had an option to purchase the remaining 51% for $325 million in 2004 from Art Modell. The Ravens won Super Bowl XXXV on January 28, 2001. On April 9, 2004 the NFL approved his purchase of the majority stake in the club.

One of the first projects Bisciotti directed as owner of the Ravens was to build the team's state-of-the-art training and practice facility, dubbed "The Castle," which opened in October 2004.

Bisciotti fired Brian Billick after the 2007 season, although Billick's eight years as the Ravens' head coach included the team's win in Super Bowl XXXV. He then surprised many observers by selecting John Harbaugh as his new coach, despite Harbaugh's peak of previous experience being a single year as a defensive backs coach after several successful years as the special teams coach for the Philadelphia Eagles.

In 2012, the Baltimore Ravens capitalized off a 10-6 season to go on to win Super Bowl XLVII against the San Francisco 49ers on February 3, 2013.

In 2005, Bisciotti ranked 378 among the Forbes 400, a list of the richest Americans.

Aerotek lawsuit
In 2009, Aerotek, the company Bisciotti co-founded, reached a $1.2 million settlement in a class-action lawsuit filed on behalf of more than 1,000 Aerotek workers who worked at a Verizon Internet Services call center in Martinsburg, West Virginia, which was closed in December 2006.  The company then was sued to settle claims that the workers were not paid in a timely fashion for accrued personal time and were not paid all of the wages that were due in accordance with the West Virginia Wage Payment and Collection Act and Fair Labor Standards Act, according to Berkeley County Circuit Court records.

Personal life
Bisciotti is Catholic and a board member for the Associated Catholic Charities and Mother Seton Academy.  He and his wife Renee (Foote) Bisciotti have two sons. The family lives on the Point Field Landing of the Severn River in Maryland.

In addition to owning the Ravens, valued at $2.7 billion in 2019; Bisciotti also owns a $20 million yacht named “Winning Drive” and 2 Dassault Falcon private jets.

References

1960 births
Living people
Baltimore Ravens owners
Salisbury University alumni
Sportspeople from Baltimore
Sportspeople from Philadelphia
People from Severna Park, Maryland
American people of Italian descent
Catholics from Maryland